Manuel 'Manu' Torres Caturla (born 14 August 1989) is a Spanish footballer who plays as a central defender.

Club career
A product of local Málaga CF, Manu made his senior debut for the club at only 17, playing one match (one minute) for the reserves in 2006–07, in the Segunda División B. After the final relegation, he subsequently spent a further two full seasons with the B side.

Torres was promoted to the main squad for the 2009–10 campaign, making his La Liga debut on 30 August 2009 in a game against Atlético Madrid and scoring in a 3–0 home win. He went on to appear in 17 league games in his first year, as the Andalusians narrowly avoided relegation. 

On 20 June 2011, Torres signed with FC Cartagena of Segunda División. He scored his only goal as a professional on 31 March 2012 in a 2–1 away loss to Real Murcia, in an eventual relegation as third-bottom. 

In the following years, safe for a brief spell in the Romanian Liga I with ACS Poli Timișoara (February-June 2016), Torres continued competing in his country's third tier, representing a host of teams.

References

External links

1989 births
Living people
People from Torremolinos
Sportspeople from the Province of Málaga
Spanish footballers
Footballers from Andalusia
Association football defenders
La Liga players
Segunda División players
Segunda División B players
Tercera División players
Atlético Malagueño players
Málaga CF players
FC Cartagena footballers
Getafe CF B players
Burgos CF footballers
FC Jumilla players
CE Sabadell FC footballers
CD Badajoz players
UE Cornellà players
Liga I players
ACS Poli Timișoara players
Spanish expatriate footballers
Expatriate footballers in Romania
Spanish expatriate sportspeople in Romania